Rosi or ROSI may refer to

People

Last name
Aleandro Rosi, Italian footballer
Alessandro Rosi, Italian Baroque artist
Francesco Rosi, Italian film director
Gianfranco Rosi (boxer), Italian boxer
Gianfranco Rosi (director), Italian film director
Stelvio Rosi, also known as Stan Cooper, Italian film actor

First name
Rosi Braidotti, philosopher and feminist theoretician
Rosi Golan, Israeli-born singer songwriter 
Rosi Manger, Swiss curler
Rosi Mittermaier, alpine skier
Rosi Sánchez, Spanish basketball player 
Rosi Sexton, mixed martial artist
Rosi Speiser, German alpine skier
Rosianna Silalahi, Indonesian news presenter known as "Rosi"

Popular culture
Cohen vs. Rosi, 1998 Argentine romantic comedy film 
Starring Rosi, experimental rock album in the Krautrock genre by Ash Ra Tempel

Fauna
Discodoris rosi, species of sea slug

River
Rosi Khola, Rosi river in Nepal

Acronyms
ROSI, Reverse osmosis solar installation
ROSI, Repository of Student Information, University of Toronto